Whirling Udumbara I ( 优昙波罗旋转舞 I ) is a work for piano,
composed by He Xuntian in 2013.

Summary
He Xuntian adopted RD Composition and SS Composition in his work Whirling Udumbara I.

Inspiration
Whirling Udumbara I was inspired from Xuntian He’s poem Fragrant Nirvana Tree (1999).

References

External links
Whirling Udumbara I published by Schott Music International, Germany

Compositions for piano by He Xuntian
Compositions for solo piano
2013 compositions